Impetigo herpetiformis is a form of severe pustular psoriasis occurring in pregnancy which may occur during any trimester.

It is the only well known pustular psoriasis which is treated with steroids.

See also 
 Dermatoses of pregnancy
 List of cutaneous conditions

Notes

References

External links 

Pregnancy-related cutaneous conditions
Psoriasis
Pathology of pregnancy, childbirth and the puerperium